Kanaloa is a god in Hawaiian mythology symbolized by the squid or by the octopus

Kanaloa may refer to:

Kanaloa manoa, a species of crustacean in the family Exoedicerotidae, the only species in the animal genus Kanoloa
Kanaloa kahoolawensis, a species of plant in the family Fabaceae, the only species in the plant genus Kanoloa
Kanaloa-class freighter, a cargo ship design